Ronald George Medved (born May 27, 1944) is a former professional American football player who played defensive back and linebacker for five seasons for the Philadelphia Eagles.

From Tacoma, Washington, Medved graduated from Bellarmine Prep in 1962 and played college football at the University of Washington in Seattle under head coach Jim Owens. He was selected in the fourteenth round of the 1966 NFL Draft by the Eagles 

Medved was the oldest of ten children (nine sons); the youngest were identical twins Jerry and Jim, linebackers at the University of Idaho in the late 1980s.  Ron was on an NFL roster before they were born.

References

External links
 

1944 births
American football cornerbacks
American football linebackers
Washington Huskies football players
Philadelphia Eagles players
Living people
Players of American football from Tacoma, Washington